Dominie may refer to
Dominie, a Scottish term for a churchman or schoolteacher
 A Minister of religion can be called a Dominie, Dom or Don
The military version of the De Havilland Dragon Rapide aircraft
The BAe Dominie trainer aircraft
"The Dominie", a fictional character in BBV audio dramas